QU is the third studio album by the American rock band Sherwood, released digitally and through Myspace Records to music stores on October 13, 2009. The album was released early in electronic format to some of those who pre-ordered due to shipping difficulties.  The album was first announced on July 14, 2009. Along with this, the band posted three songs on their MySpace page that appear on the CD. QU was produced, engineered, and mixed by Brad Wood at Seagrass Studios in Valley Village, CA.

Reception
The album was met with positive reviews; AbsolutePunk awarded QU a score of 88%, saying it "is a dynamo. From start to finish, QU is a surefire winner, backed by sterling arrangements, Henry's finest vocal work to date and easily the most confident and polished work of their career. Equal parts cohesive, stimulating and musically stunning, QU is the sound of a band at their apex and fully realizing their potential. If this doesn't turn some heads, the music industry is truly dead inside." Alternative Press reviewer Evan Lucy also praised the album, rating it four out of five, he said QU "shows remarkable growth for a band just now hitting their stride." Timothy Estabrooks of Jesus Freak Hideout commented on the album's summer-feel, and referred to its "consistently top-notch songwriting and catchy melodies", rating it a perfect score of five out of five.

Track listing

References

2009 albums
Sherwood (band) albums
Albums produced by Brad Wood